The CMLL Arena Coliseo Tag Team Championship (Spanish: Campeonato de Parejas de la Arena Coliseo del CMLL) is a professional wrestling Tag team championship promoted by the Mexican Lucha Libre wrestling based promotion Consejo Mundial de Lucha Libre (CMLL) since 2000. The championship is considered a revival of the EMLL Arena Coliseo Tag Team Championship that was used in the 1960s and 1970s when CMLL was known as "Empresa Mexicana de Lucha Libre" (EMLL). The CMLL Arena Coliseo Tag Team Championship is considered a secondary championship, with the CMLL World Tag Team Championship being the primary championship for the tag team division in CMLL. As it is a professional wrestling championship, its holders are determined by promoters or promotions, not by athletic competition. As the name indicates the championship is intended to be defended in Arena Coliseo in Mexico City; one of CMLL's primary venues.

There are no current holders of the championship as it was declared vacant on April 29, 2020. The decision was made after one-half of the then-reigning champions Tritón, who held it with Esfinge, had left CMLL several months prior. The company announced that they would hold a tournament at a future date. Esfinge and Tritón were the ninth championship team since Arena Coliseo championship was revived in 2000.

Background
The Arena Coliseo Tag Team Championship was originally created in the late 1960s or early 1970s by Empresa Mexicana de Lucha Libre (EMLL; who would change their name to CMLL around 1990) as a secondary title to the Mexican National Tag Team Championship, which was the promotion's top tag team title at the time. Records of champions from that era are sparse with no records of who was the first champion; nor are there any records of exactly when the title was abandoned in the 1980s. Due to sparse record keeping of local wrestling in Mexico between the 1960s and early 1980s no clear history exists from that time, it has been verified that Los Villanos (Villano I and Villano II), Kung Fu and Kato Kung Lee, and the team of Dios Rojo and Dios Negro all held the Arena Coliseo Tag Team Championship due to references to the teams defending the championship at an EMLL show.

The Championship was revived in 2000, and was mainly contested for by younger or lower ranked wrestlers than those that challenged for the CMLL World Tag Team Championship. The first champions were found via a one night, eight-team tournament held to determine the first CMLL Arena Coliseo Tag Team Champions. On the night, the team of brothers Alan and Chris Stone (sometimes billed as "Motorcross") defeated the teams of Neutron and La Flecha, Ricky Marvin and Sombra de Plata and finally Fugaz and Virus to become the first CMLL Arena Coliseo Tag Team Champions in the modern era. The Stone brothers defended the title until 2002, after which the championship was barely mentioned, much less promoted by CMLL. The title is considered inactive after the Stone brothers' last recorded title defense on October 22, 2002, against Valetin Mayo and Karloff Lagarde Jr. When both Stone brothers left CMLL in 2005 to work for AAA the championship was finally declared vacant.

In June 2008 CMLL announced that they were bringing the CMLL Arena Coliseo Tag Team Championship back. A 16-team tournament was held to crown new champions, the competitors were a mixture of regular teams and random parings of CMLL low to mid-card workers. The preliminary rounds were held on June 22, 2008, and saw the teams of Stuka Jr. and Flash (Collectively known as Los Bombadieros; "The Bombardiers") and Los Infernales ("The Infernal Ones"; Euforia and Nosferatu) each win three matches to qualify for the final. On June 28, 2008, Stuka Jr. and Flash defeated Los Infernales to become the second CMLL Arena Coliseum Tag Team Champions of the modern age. Flash later changed his ring name to "Fuego". On March 3, 2013, La Fiebre Amarilla ("The Yellow Fever"; Namajague and Okumura) defeated Fuego and Stuka Jr. to become the third modern age CMLL Arena Coliseo Tag Team Champions, ending the previous champions' four and a half year reign. On November 4, 2013, Delta and Guerrero Maya Jr. became the fourth modern age Arena Coliseo Tag Team Champions. After a long-running rivalry with the then-champions Delta and Guerrero Maya Jr., La Comando Caribeño ("The Caribbean Commando"; Misterioso Jr. and Sagrado) became the fifth modern day Arena Coliseo Tag Team Champions on February 28, 2015.

Reigns

The championship is currently vacant, as CMLL announced that the previous championship team of Esfinge and Tritón, had been stripped of the championship and a tournament would be held at a future date. The decision was made several months after Tritón had left CMLL.

Guerrero Maya Jr. is the only wrestler to have two documented title reigns during the CMLL-era, as he previously held the titles with Delta. No team has held the championship more than once after it was brought back in 2000, but records indicate that team of Kung Fu and Kato Kung Lee held the championship on at least two separate occasions, possibly more. The current champions are also the shortest reigning champions of the modern age, second to only to Namajague and Okumura's reign of 245 days, but will surpass that if they remain champions until August 28, 2017. Los Bombardieros reign is the longest of the modern age, 1,708 days although there were extended periods of time where the championship went undefended. Black Terry, who was 64 years old at the time of his title victory, is the oldest person to win the Arena Coliseo Tag Team Championship. The Panther was seventeen or eighteen years old at the time he won the championship, making him the youngest champion of at least the CMLL-era and possibly in the history of the championship. In 2005, after both Stone brothers left CMLL to work for AAA, the championship was finally declared vacant.

Rules
The CMLL Arena Coliseo Tag Team Championship is designed for tag team competition only, teams of two, and has not allowed neither individual wrestlers to hold the championship by themselves nor teams of three to share the championship. The championship is considered a secondary championship for the tag team division; with the CMLL World Tag Team Championship being the primary championship for the tag team division in CMLL. As it is a professional wrestling championship, its holders are determined by promoters or promotions, not by athletic competition.

CMLL promotes a number of championships with the "world" label as well as a number of championships restricted by geographical locations such as the Mexican National Championships, or the Guadalajara specific Occidente championships, but the CMLL Arena Coliseo Tag Team Championship was created specifically for Arena Coliseo in Mexico City. Arena Coliseo was once CMLL's primary venue with CMLL founder Salvador Lutteroth financing the construction of the building in the 1940s. While CMLL also promotes shows in "Arena Coliseo" in Guadalajara on a regular basis, and occasionally in other regional Arena Coliseos across Mexico it has restricted championship matches to Arena Coliseo in Mexico City. CMLL has only allowed the championship to be defended outside of Arena Coliseo in Mexico City on a few occasions, primarily in Arena México when the regularly scheduled Arena Coliseo shows had to be moved. In January 2016, CMLL allowed the championship to be defended in Korakuen Hall in Tokyo, as part of the Fantastica Mania 2016 tour. The championship has only been won and lost in Arena Coliseo, except for when Black Terry and Negro Navarro won the championship in Arena Naucalpan.

Tournaments

2000
CMLL held a one-night, eight-team tournament on November 7, 2000, to determine the first CMLL Arena Coloseo Tag Team Champions of the modern era, bringing the titles back after abandoning them in the 1980s.

{{8TeamBracket-NoSeeds | RD1=First round| RD2=Semifinals| RD3=Final
| team-width=200

| RD1-team1=Ricky Marvin and Sombra de Plata
| RD1-team2=Enemigo Pubico and Mazada
| RD1-score1=W
| RD1-score2= 

| RD1-team3=Los Hermanos Stone(Alan Stone and Motorcross)
| RD1-team4=Neutron and La Flecha
| RD1-score3=W
| RD1-score4= 

| RD1-team5=Volador Jr. and Mano Negra Jr.
| RD1-team6=Jeque and Sangre Azteca
| RD1-score5=W
| RD1-score6= 

| RD1-team7=Virus and Fugaz
| RD1-team8=Los Rayos Tapatío(Rayo Tapatío I and Rayo Tapatío II)
| RD1-score7=W
| RD1-score8= 

| RD2-team1=Ricky Marvin and Sombra de Plata
| RD2-team2=Los Hermanos Stone| RD2-score1= 
| RD2-score2=W| RD2-team3=Volador Jr. and Mano Negro Jr.
| RD2-team4=Virus and Fugaz| RD2-score3= 
| RD2-score4=W| RD3-team1=Los Hermanos Stone| RD3-team2=Virus and Fugaz
| RD3-score1=W'| RD3-score2= 
}}

2008
CMLL held a 16-team tournament in 2008; the top half of the bracket took place on June 15, the bottom half on June 19 and the finals took place on June 29, 2008.

2018
On February 14, 2018, then Arena Coliseo tag team champions Nuevo Generacion Dinamitas'' (El Cuatrero and Sansón) announced that they were giving up the championship to focus on a tournament for the vacant CMLL World Tag Team Championship that had just been announced. CMLL held a 16-team elimination tournament starting on February 24, 2018, with subsequent tournament matches taking place on March 5 and the finals on March 11. In the end Esfinge and Tritón defeated Disturbio and Virus to win the vacant championship.

Title history

Combined reigns
Key

Footnotes

References

Consejo Mundial de Lucha Libre championships
Tag team wrestling championships
Regional professional wrestling championships